Apolinor Giménez Iriarte (born 20 January 1944) is a Paraguayan former football goalkeeper. He played most of his club career for Club Olimpia, winning six league titles in 14 seasons.

Playing career
Born in Paraguarí, Giménez emerged from the youth team of Club Sudamérica de Paraguarí. He joined Asunción side Club Olimpia in 1962, and would win four Paraguayan Primera División in a decade with the club.

In 1972, Giménez moved abroad to play for Cruz Azul in the Primera División de México. He won three titles in three years with the club.

Giménez was called up as a third goalkeeper for the Paraguay national football team which played in the 1970 FIFA World Cup qualifiers.

References

External links

1944 births
Living people
People from Paraguarí
Paraguayan footballers
Paraguayan expatriate footballers
Paraguay international footballers
Paraguayan Primera División players
Liga MX players
Categoría Primera A players
Club Olimpia footballers
Club Sportivo San Lorenzo footballers
Cruz Azul footballers
Club Puebla players
C.F. Monterrey players
Independiente Medellín footballers
Expatriate footballers in Mexico
Expatriate footballers in Colombia
Association football goalkeepers
Paraguayan expatriate sportspeople in Mexico
Paraguayan expatriate sportspeople in Colombia